Idol School is a South Korean reality television show.


Contestants 
English names are according to the official website.

Age is shown according to Korean age system.

Elimination chart
Color Key

 In episode 4, The members of the Yukhoe Rice Team each won an Individual Ranking +1.
 In episode 6, The members of the Ji! Seo! He!, Hush Team, By Collecting Dreams and Forever Love Team each won an Individual Ranking +3. Park So-myeong won Individual Ranking of +6 as Most Improved Student, hence she was tied 6th with Yoo Ji-na who had no ranking boosts.
 In episode 7, Song Ha-young and Lee Sae-rom won the 2nd live and Individual Ranking +1.

Debut Diagnostic Exam 1 (Episodes 3-4) 
The members of the Yukhoe Rice team each won an Individual Ranking +1 card that is automatically in play during the final voting, and a video call to their families.
Color Key

Debut Diagnostic Exam 2 (Episodes 5-6) 
Color Key

Kakao TV Broadcasts (Episode 7) 
Channel in Bold represents the team with highest viewership numbers, and each gets Rankings +1 card.

Debut Diagnostic Exam 3 (Episode 8-9) 
Color Key

Final Debut Diagnostic Exam (Episode 11)

Notes 
 At the end of the elimination show on episode 4, the eliminated students were given the option to be trained separately in the "Careers Club/Normal Class" with the same teachers which may give them the chance to debut in the future. Initially, the students accepted, but all declined the offer to return later as some of those students were already approached by different entertainment companies.
 All rankings are listed after all cards' effects are taken into account.
 *Lee Young-yoo and Kim Eun-kyul were in different classes, but as their remaining classmates were eliminated after episode 4, so they were reassigned. Of the eliminated students, Intermediate Vocal Class was wiped out altogether. The speculated classes were not revealed on the show.
 As the lowest score by a substantial margin, the individual scores and rankings for Catallena Team was not disclosed.
 In episode 10, the top 18 were not revealed, only the bottom 9 that were eliminated were revealed.

References

Idol School contestants
Idol school contestants
Idol school contestants
Idol school contestants
Idol school contestants
Lists of women